In geometry, the 120-cell is the convex regular 4-polytope (four-dimensional analogue of a Platonic solid) with Schläfli symbol {5,3,3}. It is also called a C120,  dodecaplex (short for "dodecahedral complex"), hyperdodecahedron, polydodecahedron, hecatonicosachoron, dodecacontachoron and hecatonicosahedroid.

The boundary of the 120-cell is composed of 120 dodecahedral cells with 4 meeting at each vertex. Together they form 720 pentagonal faces, 1200 edges, and 600 vertices. It is the 4-dimensional analogue of the regular dodecahedron, since just as a dodecahedron has 12 pentagonal facets, with 3 around each vertex, the dodecaplex has 120 dodecahedral facets, with 3 around each edge. Its dual polytope is the 600-cell.

Geometry 
The 120-cell incorporates the geometries of every convex regular polytope in the first four dimensions (except the polygons {7} and above). As the sixth and largest regular convex 4-polytope, it contains inscribed instances of its four predecessors (recursively). It also contains 120 inscribed instances of the first in the sequence, the 5-cell, which is not found in any of the others. The 120-cell is a four-dimensional Swiss Army knife: it contains one of everything.

It is daunting but instructive to study the 120-cell, because it contains examples of every relationship among all the convex regular polytopes found in the first four dimensions. Conversely, it can only be understood by first understanding each of its predecessors, and the sequence of increasingly complex symmetries they exhibit. That is why Stillwell titled his paper on the 4-polytopes and the history of mathematics of more than 3 dimensions The Story of the 120-cell.

Cartesian coordinates
Natural Cartesian coordinates for a 4-polytope centered at the origin of 4-space occur in different frames of reference, depending on the long radius (center-to-vertex) chosen.

radius coordinates 
The 120-cell with long radius  = 2 ≈ 2.828 has edge length   = 3− ≈ 0.764.  

where φ (also called τ) is the golden ratio,  ≈ 1.618.

Unit radius coordinates 
The unit-radius 120-cell has edge length  ≈ 0.270. 

In this frame of reference the 120-cell lies vertex up, and its coordinates are the {permutations} and [even permutations] in the left column below:

The table gives the coordinates of two instances of each of the inscribed 4-polytopes, but the 120-cell contains multiples of five inscribed instances of each of its precursor 4-polytopes, occupying different subsets of its vertices. The (600-point) 120-cell is the convex hull of 5 disjoint (120-point) 600-cells. Each (120-point) 600-cell is the convex hull of 5 disjoint (24-point) 24-cells, so the 120-cell is the convex hull of 25 disjoint 24-cells. Each 24-cell is the convex hull of 3 disjoint (8-point) 16-cells, so the 120-cell is the convex hull of 75 disjoint 16-cells. Uniquely, the (600-point) 120-cell is the convex hull of 120 disjoint (5-point) 5-cells.

Chords

The 600-point 120-cell has all 8 of the 120-point 600-cell's distinct chord lengths, plus two additional important chords: its own shorter edges, and the edges of its 120 inscribed regular 5-cells.

The 120-cell's edges do not form ordinary great circles in a single central plane the way the edges of the 600-cell, 24-cell, and 16-cell do. Like the edges of the 8-cell tesseract, they form zig-zag Petrie polygons instead. The 120-cell's Petrie polygon is a triacontagon {30} zig-zag skew polygon. Successive vertices of the Petrie 30-gon lie in three different decagon central planes.

Since the 120-cell has a circumference of 30 edges, it has 15 distinct chord lengths, ranging from its edge length to its diameter. Since every regular convex 4-polytope is inscribed in the 120-cell, these 15 chords are the complete set of all the distinct chords in the regular 4-polytopes.

Polyhedral graph
Considering the adjacency matrix of the vertices representing the polyhedral graph of the unit-radius 120-cell, the graph diameter is 15, connecting each vertex to its coordinate-negation at a Euclidean distance of 2 away (its circumdiameter), and there are 24 different paths to connect them along the polytope edges. From each vertex, there are 4 vertices at distance 1, 12 at distance 2, 24 at distance 3, 36 at distance 4, 52 at distance 5, 68 at distance 6, 76 at distance 7, 78 at distance 8, 72 at distance 9, 64 at distance 10, 56 at distance 11, 40 at distance 12, 12 at distance 13, 4 at distance 14, and 1 at distance 15. The adjacency matrix has 27 distinct eigenvalues ranging from  ≈ 0.270, with a multiplicity of 4, to 2, with a multiplicity of 1. The multiplicity of eigenvalue 0 is 18, and the rank of the adjacency matrix is 582.

The vertices of the 120-cell polyhedral graph are 3-colorable.

The graph is Eulerian having degree 4 in every vertex. Its edge set can be decomposed into two Hamiltonian cycles.

Concentric hulls

Constructions 
The 120-cell is the sixth in the sequence of 6 convex regular 4-polytopes (in order of size and complexity). It can be deconstructed into ten distinct instances (or five disjoint instances) of its immediate predecessor (and dual) the 600-cell, just as the 600-cell can be deconstructed into twenty-five distinct instances (or five disjoint instances) of its immediate predecessor the 24-cell, the 24-cell can be deconstructed into three distinct instances of its predecessor the tesseract (8-cell), and the 8-cell can be deconstructed into two disjoint instances of its predecessor the 16-cell. The 120-cell contains 675 distinct instances (75 disjoint instances) of the 16-cell.

The reverse procedure to construct each of these from an instance of its predecessor preserves the radius of the predecessor, but generally produces a successor with a smaller edge length. The 600-cell's edge length is ~0.618 times its radius (the inverse golden ratio), but the 120-cell's edge length is ~0.270 times its radius.

Dual 600-cells 

Since the 120-cell is the dual of the 600-cell, it can be constructed from the 600-cell by placing its 600 vertices at the center of volume of each of the 600 tetrahedral cells. From a 600-cell of unit long radius, this results in a 120-cell of slightly smaller long radius ( ≈ 0.926) and edge length of exactly 1/4. Thus the unit-edge-length 120-cell (with long radius φ2 ≈ 3.702) can be constructed in this manner just inside a 600-cell of long radius 4.

Reciprocally, the 120-cell whose coordinates are given above of long radius  = 2 ≈ 2.828 and edge length  = 3− ≈ 0.764 can be constructed just outside a 600-cell of slightly smaller long radius, by placing the center of each dodecahedral cell at one of the 120 600-cell vertices.

Cell rotations of inscribed duals 
Since the 120-cell contains inscribed 600-cells, it contains its own dual of the same radius. The 120-cell contains five disjoint 600-cells (ten overlapping inscribed 600-cells of which we can pick out five disjoint 600-cells in two different ways), so it can be seen as a compound of five of its own dual (in two ways). The vertices of each inscribed 600-cell are vertices of the 120-cell, and (dually) each dodecahedral cell center is a tetrahedral cell center in each of the inscribed 600-cells. 

The dodecahedral cells of the 120-cell have tetrahedral cells of the 600-cells inscribed in them. Just as the 120-cell is a compound of five 600-cells (in two ways), the dodecahedron is a compound of five regular tetrahedra (in two ways). As two opposing tetrahedra can be inscribed in a cube, and five cubes can be inscribed in a dodecahedron, ten tetrahedra in five cubes can be inscribed in a dodecahedron: two opposing sets of five, with each set covering all 20 vertices and each vertex in two tetrahedra (one from each set, but not the opposing pair of a cube obviously). This shows that the 120-cell contains, among its many interior features, 120 compounds of ten tetrahedra, each of which is dimensionally analogous to the whole 120-cell as a compound of ten 600-cells.

All ten tetrahedra can be generated by two chiral five-click rotations of any one tetrahedron. In each dodecahedral cell, one tetrahedral cell comes from each of the ten 600-cells inscribed in the 120-cell. Therefore the whole 120-cell, with all ten inscribed 600-cells, can be generated from just one 600-cell by rotating its cells.

Augmentation 
Another consequence of the 120-cell containing inscribed 600-cells is that it is possible to construct it by placing 4-pyramids of some kind on the cells of the 600-cell. These tetrahedral pyramids must be quite irregular in this case (with the apex blunted into four 'apexes'), but we can discern their shape in the way a tetrahedron lies inscribed in a dodecahedron.

Only 120 tetrahedral cells of each 600-cell can be inscribed in the 120-cell's dodecahedra; its other 480 tetrahedra span dodecahedral cells. Each dodecahedron-inscribed tetrahedron is the center cell of a cluster of five tetrahedra, with the four others face-bonded around it lying only partially within the dodecahedron. The central tetrahedron is edge-bonded to an additional 12 tetrahedral cells, also lying only partially within the dodecahedron. The central cell is vertex-bonded to 40 other tetrahedral cells which lie entirely outside the dodecahedron.

Weyl orbits 
Another construction method uses quaternions and the Icosahedral symmetry of Weyl group orbits  of order 120. The following describe  and  24-cells as quaternion orbit weights of D4 under the Weyl group W(D4):
O(0100) : T = {±1,±e1,±e2,±e3,(±1±e1±e2±e3)/2}
O(1000) : V1
O(0010) : V2
O(0001) : V3

 the snub 24-cell 
 the 600-cell  
 the 120-cell 
 the alternate snub 24-cell 
 the dual snub 24-cell = .

As a configuration 
This configuration matrix represents the 120-cell. The rows and columns correspond to vertices, edges, faces, and cells. The diagonal numbers say how many of each element occur in the whole 120-cell. The nondiagonal numbers say how many of the column's element occur in or at the row's element.

Here is the configuration expanded with k-face elements and k-figures. The diagonal element counts are the ratio of the full Coxeter group order, 14400, divided by the order of the subgroup with mirror removal.

Visualization 
The 120-cell consists of 120 dodecahedral cells.  For visualization purposes, it is convenient that the dodecahedron has opposing parallel faces (a trait it shares with the cells of the tesseract and the 24-cell).  One can stack dodecahedrons face to face in a straight line bent in the 4th direction into a great circle with a circumference of 10 cells.  Starting from this initial ten cell construct there are two common visualizations one can use: a layered stereographic projection, and a structure of intertwining rings.

Layered stereographic projection 
The cell locations lend themselves to a hyperspherical description.  Pick an arbitrary dodecahedron and label it the "north pole".  Twelve great circle meridians (four cells long) radiate out in 3 dimensions, converging at the fifth "south pole" cell.  This skeleton accounts for 50 of the 120 cells (2 + 4 × 12).

Starting at the North Pole, we can build up the 120-cell in 9 latitudinal layers, with allusions to terrestrial 2-sphere topography in the table below.  With the exception of the poles, the centroids of the cells of each layer lie on a separate 2-sphere, with the equatorial centroids lying on a great 2-sphere. The centroids of the 30 equatorial cells form the vertices of an icosidodecahedron, with the meridians (as described above) passing through the center of each pentagonal face. The cells labeled "interstitial" in the following table do not fall on meridian great circles.

The cells of layers 2, 4, 6 and 8 are located over the faces of the pole cell. The cells of layers 3 and 7 are located directly over the vertices of the pole cell.  The cells of layer 5 are located over the edges of the pole cell.

Intertwining rings 

The 120-cell can be partitioned into 12 disjoint 10-cell great circle rings, forming a discrete/quantized Hopf fibration. Starting with one 10-cell ring, one can place another ring alongside it that spirals around the original ring one complete revolution in ten cells.  Five such 10-cell rings can be placed adjacent to the original 10-cell ring.  Although the outer rings "spiral" around the inner ring (and each other), they actually have no helical torsion.  They are all equivalent.  The spiraling is a result of the 3-sphere curvature.  The inner ring and the five outer rings now form a six ring, 60-cell solid torus. One can continue adding 10-cell rings adjacent to the previous ones, but it's more instructive to construct a second torus, disjoint from the one above, from the remaining 60 cells, that interlocks with the first.  The 120-cell, like the 3-sphere, is the union of these two (Clifford) tori.  If the center ring of the first torus is a meridian great circle as defined above, the center ring of the second torus is the equatorial great circle that is centered on the meridian circle. Also note that the spiraling shell of 50 cells around a center ring can be either left handed or right handed.  It's just a matter of partitioning the cells in the shell differently, i.e. picking another set of disjoint (Clifford parallel) great circles.

Other great circle constructs 
There is another great circle path of interest that alternately passes through opposing cell vertices, then along an edge.  This path consists of 6 edges alternating with 6 cell diameter chords.  Both the above great circle paths have dual great circle paths in the 600-cell.  The 10 cell face to face path above maps to a 10 vertex path solely traversing along edges in the 600-cell, forming a decagon.  The alternating cell/edge path above maps to a path consisting of 12 tetrahedrons alternately meeting face to face then vertex to vertex (six triangular bipyramids) in the 600-cell.  This latter path corresponds to a ring of six icosahedra meeting face to face in the snub 24-cell (or icosahedral pyramids in the 600-cell), and to a great hexagon or a ring of six octahedra meeting face to face in the 24-cell.

Projections

Orthogonal projections 

Orthogonal projections of the 120-cell can be done in 2D by defining two orthonormal basis vectors for a specific view direction. The 30-gonal projection was made in 1963 by B. L. Chilton.

The H3 decagonal projection shows the plane of the van Oss polygon.

3-dimensional orthogonal projections can also be made with three orthonormal basis vectors, and displayed as a 3d model, and then projecting a certain perspective in 3D for a 2d image.

Perspective projections
These projections use perspective projection, from a specific viewpoint in four dimensions, projecting the model as a 3D shadow. Therefore, faces and cells that look larger are merely closer to the 4D viewpoint. Schlegel diagrams use perspective to show four-dimensional figures, choosing a point above a specific cell, thus making that cell the envelope of the 3D model, with other cells appearing smaller inside it. Stereographic projections use the same approach, but are shown with curved edges, representing the polytope as a tiling of a 3-sphere.

A comparison of perspective projections from 3D to 2D is shown in analogy.

Related polyhedra and honeycombs

H4 polytopes 
The 120-cell is one of 15 regular and uniform polytopes with the same H4 symmetry [3,3,5]:

{p,3,3} polytopes 
The 120-cell is similar to three regular 4-polytopes: the 5-cell {3,3,3} and tesseract {4,3,3} of Euclidean 4-space, and the hexagonal tiling honeycomb {6,3,3} of hyperbolic space. All of these have a tetrahedral vertex figure {3,3}:

{5,3,p} polytopes 
The 120-cell is a part of a sequence of 4-polytopes and honeycombs with dodecahedral cells:

Davis 120-cell 

See also
Uniform 4-polytope family with [5,3,3] symmetry
57-cell – an abstract regular 4-polytope constructed from 57 hemi-dodecahedra.
600-cell - the dual 4-polytope to the 120-cell

Notes

Citations

References

 
 
 
 (Paper 22) H.S.M. Coxeter, Regular and Semi Regular Polytopes I, [Math. Zeit. 46 (1940) 380-407, MR 2,10]
 (Paper 23) H.S.M. Coxeter, Regular and Semi-Regular Polytopes II, [Math. Zeit. 188 (1985) 559-591]
 (Paper 24) H.S.M. Coxeter, Regular and Semi-Regular Polytopes III, [Math. Zeit. 200 (1988) 3-45]
 
 
 
 J.H. Conway and M.J.T. Guy: Four-Dimensional Archimedean Polytopes, Proceedings of the Colloquium on Convexity at Copenhagen, page 38 und 39, 1965
 N.W. Johnson: The Theory of Uniform Polytopes and Honeycombs, Ph.D. Dissertation, University of Toronto, 1966
Four-dimensional Archimedean Polytopes (German), Marco Möller, 2004 PhD dissertation

External links
 

 
 
 Der 120-Zeller (120-cell) Marco Möller's Regular polytopes in R4 (German)
120-cell explorer – A free interactive program that allows you to learn about a number of the 120-cell symmetries.  The 120-cell is projected to 3 dimensions and then rendered using OpenGL.
 Construction of the Hyper-Dodecahedron
 YouTube animation of the construction of the 120-cell  Gian Marco Todesco.

Individual graphs
 120
Articles containing video clips